Gangakhed is a city located on banks of Godavari River and a municipal council in Parbhani district  in the state of Maharashtra, India. It is also known as Dakshin Kashi. It is also the second largest city In Parbhani District.

Demographics
 India census, Gangakhed had a population of 70000 Males constitute 51% of the population and females 49%. Gangakhed has an average literacy rate of 60%, higher than the national average of 59.5%: male literacy is 68%, and female literacy is 52%. In Gangakhed, 16% of the population is under 6 years of age which may have changed significantly through the last decade. Gangakhed is the largest Taluka in Parbhani district. This is a historical place on the bank of Godavari river. There is a famous God Balaji temple

Education
There are many schools in Gangakhed for primary and secondary education. Along with these, there is ACS college governed by "Sant janbai education society"which was established in 1972. It has all educational facilities for three-year degree courses in Arts, Commerce, and Science. There are many small colleges for D.Ed., B.Ed., BCS, BCA. All the colleges in Gangakhed are affiliated with Swami Ramanand Teerth Marathwada University, Nanded.
In Gangakhed city there are best school for Primary and secondary Education .
In gangakhed Saraswati Vidyalaya is one of the best school for primary and secondary Education. In this school Semi English medium and Marathi medium are both medium which are available for students.

On other Venkatesh Vidyalaya is another best school which provides primary and secondary Education. This school has established before Independence of India. This is most famous school for primary and secondary Education in Parbhani district.

Also,  Sant Janabai Vidyalaya are few schools in Gangakhed.Dr. Zakir Hussain Primary and High School provides Urdu medium education.

Industry and business
There is a sugar factory by Ratnakar Gutte with a combined cycle power plant in Gangakhed which caters to the sugarcane farmers in the local region.
Several small-scale businesses and business agencies thrive mostly around agricultural sector. There is also edible oil industry which runs by public and private sector; the region is famous for edible oil production and also famous for cotton production and related industries because Gangakhed is located on Deccan Trap and the bank of river Godavari so the regur soil is there and is very useful for cotton production.

Business in the city is ever blooming key sectors are cloth, agriculture consumables. Consumers not only locals but also from far off cities come here to purchase clothes and sarees.

Hospitals
A government hospital and several private hospitals are operational in the town.

Hindu temples
Gangakhed is the birthplace of Shree Sant Janabai. As it is situated on the bank of Godavari river it has largest number of various temples on the bank of the holy river. The Balaji temple which is the only temple like Tirupati Balaji, having both Balaji and Govinda under one roof. From many years Navratra festival is celebrated with the big event "Rath Yatra". Also, the Chintamani Mandir, of lord Ganesha, which is situated near the Balaji Temple on the bank of river, giving a nice view of Godawari river. People celebrate Cahturthi and other poojas at this temple. Some more temples to mention are - Bomblya mahadev, Narsimha mandir both placed on the river bank, Datta Mandir is also one of the important temples in Gangakhed. Shiv temple named as "Mannath Mandir" is a revered temple in the southern part of the city, this is popular amongst devotees and has many visitors in Shravan month of Hindu calendar.

Transportation

Railway

Gangakhed is a station on the Parbhani to Parli route.
Gangakhed is a second class Railway Station, its Station Code is GNH.  Gangakhed was a large taluka long ago and it was a very prosperous taluka between Sonpeth and Palam.

Few of the trains halts Parli Vaijnath Purna Passenger, Purna Parli Vaijnath Passenger, Hazur Sahib Nanded Express, Kolhapur Nagpur Express.

Road

Gangakhed has a Maharashtra State Road Transport Corporation(MSRTC) Bus Stop and a MSRTC maintenance depo. This MSRTC Bus Stop connected to all major cities of Maharashtra and villages in the Gangakhed Taluka. Gangakhed has direct roads to Parbhani, Parli, Nanded, Ahmedpur, Latur.

Airway
The nearest airport is Shri Guru Gobind Singh Ji Airport, Nanded. The airport is connected to all major cities of India.

Water

Although Gangakhed is situated on the bank of Godavari, a major river in the country, it does not have any means of transportation via water due to lack of enough water level and preference toward road and rail transports.

See also
 Ranisawargaon
 Gopichand Gad

References
4.  Education information :- amhimarathi.in

Talukas in Maharashtra
Cities and towns in Parbhani district